Craspedopoma costatum is a species of tropical land snail with an operculum, terrestrial gastropod mollusks in the family Craspedopomatidae. This species is endemic to Spain.

References

Craspedopoma
Endemic molluscs of the Iberian Peninsula
Endemic fauna of Spain
Gastropods described in 1857
Taxonomy articles created by Polbot
Craspedopomatidae